Dorothy Lowry-Corry (1885 – 22 March 1967) was an Irish historian and archaeologist.

Biography
Dorothy Lowry-Corry was born at Castle Coole, County Fermanagh as one of 13 children of Somerset Richard Lowry-Corry, 4th Earl Belmore and Anne Elizabeth Honoria Gladstone. She developed an interest in history with a particular focus on the Early Christian period. Lowry-Corry wrote a number of papers, many for the Royal Irish Academy and to the Ulster Journal of Archaeology. She was particularly involved in the recording of the stone figures on Boa Island and Lustymore Island. She also discovered the Corracloona Court Tomb of County Leitrim. Lowry-Corry was the vice-president of the Royal Society of Antiquaries and represented County Fermanagh on the Ancient Monuments Advisory Committee. She died 22 March 1967.

Sources

1885 births
1967 deaths
Irish archaeologists
Daughters of Irish earls
Irish women archaeologists